A well-boat is a fishing vessel with a well or tank for the storage and transport of live fish.  The term was first used in the 17th century. Before modern refrigeration methods, well-boats allowed for the delivery of live fish to port.

Contemporary well-boats are used in the extensive aquaculture industry.  These vessels can be used to transport smolt to sea, to bring them from aquaculture sites for processing and to sort and delouse fish.

A well-boat can also refer to a mullet boat or skiff, a small (shallow) draft recreational fishing boat with an outboard motor in a well in the middle of boat.

References

See also

Well smack, a type of well-boat

Types of fishing vessels